Broke Inlet, originally named Broke's Inlet, is an inlet in the South West region of Western Australia located  west of Walpole.

The inlet is a large shallow estuary at the eastern end of the d'Entrecasteaux National Park, linked to the Southern Ocean by a narrow seasonally open channel situated between two high sand dune systems. 

The inlet is the only large estuary left in the South West that has not been significantly altered by development within its catchment area or along its shores. 

The water in the inlet is brackish and generally has half the salinity of sea water. The salinity varies greatly depending on river discharge, the season and whether the bar is open or not.

Broke Inlet is listed as a regionally significant wetland with Environment Australia.

References 

Inlets of Western Australia
South coast of Western Australia
D'Entrecasteaux National Park